Ungulipetalum is a genus of flowering plants belonging to the family Menispermaceae.

Its native range is Southeastern Brazil.

Species:
 Ungulipetalum filipendulum (Mart.) Moldenke

References

Menispermaceae
Menispermaceae genera